Ewijk is a village in the Dutch province of Gelderland. It is a part of the municipality of Beuningen, and lies about 9 km west of Nijmegen. The river Waal runs in the north.

Ewijk was a separate municipality until 1980, when it was merged with Beuningen.

History 
It was first mentioned in 855 as Euuic, and means "neighbourhood near water". Doddendaal is a castle near Ewijk. Part of the wall with corner towers date from the 14th century. The main building was damaged by fire in 1590, and was repaired in the early-17th century. Between 1973 and 1976, it was restored and has become a restaurant. In 1840, it was home to 680 people.

The A50 and A73 motorway meet at Ewijk, and in the late 20th century, the town was mainly known for its daily traffic jams. In 2011, the Tacitusbrug over the Waal was widened from 2x2 to 2x4 lanes.

Monuments
There are 21 Rijksmonuments in Ewijk. Here are a few (in chronological order):

 Old Tower, 12th century
 , 14th century
 De Clef Inn, 17th century
 Gable Roof Farm, 1799
 Doddendael Castle Park, ca. 1825
 John the Baptist church, 1916-1917

Notable people 
 Susan de Klein (1973–2019), dressage rider
 Patje, football coach
 Heino, semi-professional football player

Gallery

References 

Populated places in Gelderland
Former municipalities of Gelderland
Beuningen